Sinigapuna is a Filipino rice dish cooked with turmeric and other spices. It originates from Kalagan (or Caragan) people of the Caraga and Davao Regions of Mindanao. It is similar to the Maranao kuning, and Indonesian nasi kuning.

See also
 Kuning
 Nasi Kuning
 Palapa
 Sinangag

References

Philippine rice dishes